Lembit Kolk may refer to:

 Lembit Kolk (politician) (1907–2003), Estonian politician
 Lembit Kolk (sportspeople) (born 1944), Estonian sportspeople and police official